Boys' BMX was part of the cycling at the 2010 Summer Youth Olympics program. The event consisted of a seeding round, then elimination rounds where after three races the top 4 would progress to the next round until the final where only a single race was held.  It was held on 19 August 2010 at Tampines Bike Park.  This was not an official individual event and therefore medals were not given.  However the performance of the athletes provided points towards the Combined Mixed Team event for cycling.

Seeding Round 
The seeding round began at approximately 10:00 a.m. (UTC+8) on 19 August at Tampines Bike Park.

Quarterfinals
The quarterfinals began at approximately 1:42 p.m. (UTC+8) on 19 August at Tampines Bike Park.

Heat 1

Heat 2

Heat 3

Heat 4

Semifinals
The semifinals began at approximately 3:00 p.m. (UTC+8) on 19 August at Tampines Bike Park.

Heat 1

Heat 2

Finals
The finals began at approximately 4:17 p.m. (UTC+8) on 19 August at Tampines Bike Park.

Points

References 

 Seeding Round
 Quarterfinals
 Semifinals
 Final

Cycling at the 2010 Summer Youth Olympics
2010 in BMX